The 1986 Philadelphia Eagles season was their 54th in the National Football League (NFL). The team was unable to improve upon their previous output win total of seven. Instead, the team finished with five wins, ten losses and one tie. This was the fifth consecutive season in which the team failed to qualify for the playoffs.

The season was head coach Buddy Ryan's first with the team after serving as the defensive coordinator of the Chicago Bears, who had won the Super Bowl the previous season.

Quarterback duties were split between 35-year-old veteran Ron Jaworski, who started nine games in his final season with the team, and second-year quarterback Randall Cunningham. Veteran quarterback Matt Cavanaugh also started two games. The Eagles' passing game struggled, with the third-fewest passing yards in the league (2,540), and the fewest yards-per-attempt (4.1).

The Eagles set dubious NFL records by giving up a record number of sacks (a still-standing NFL-record of 104) and yardage allowed on sacks (708). No other team in football history had ever given up more than 78 sacks or 554 yards on quarterback sacks. The team gave up three-or-more sacks in every single game of the 1986 season, the only team in NFL history to do so.

The lone highlights of the season came on the road. On October 5, the Eagles entered Fulton County Stadium and shut out the Atlanta Falcons, 16–0. then gained a comeback 33–27 overtime win against the Los Angeles Raiders at Los Angeles Memorial Coliseum on November 30, the Eagles’ first win over the club since the 1980 season and first-ever victory on the road against the Raiders.

NFL draft 

The table shows the Eagles selections and what picks they had that were traded away and the team that ended up with that pick. It is possible the Eagles' pick ended up with this team via another team that the Eagles made a trade with.
Not shown are acquired picks that the Eagles traded away.

 Supplemental pick

Personnel

Staff

Roster

Schedule 

Note: Intra-division opponents are in bold text.

Game summaries

Week 2

Week 6: at New York Giants

Week 10: vs. New York Giants

Week 13 

    
    
    
    
    
    
    
    
    
    

 Mike Quick 8 Rec, 145 Yds, 3 TD

Standings

Awards and honors 
 Keith Byars, Franchise record, most rushing yards by a rookie

References

External links 
 

Philadelphia Eagles seasons
Philadelphia Eagles
Philadelphia Eagles